Archive Manager (previously File Roller) is the file archiver of the GNOME desktop environment.

Archive Manager can:
 Create and modify archives
 View the content of an archive
 View a file contained in the archive
 Extract files from the archive

File formats
Supporting the archive formats requires external back-end programs and libraries, it supports:

 7z
 ace
 ar
 alz
 apk
 arj
 bin
 br
 bz
 bz2
 cab
 cbz
 cbz
 cpio
 crx
 deb (read)
 dll
 ear
 epub
 exe
 gz
 iso (read)
 jar
 lha
 lhz
 lrz
 lz
 lz4
 lzh
 lzma
 lzo
 pkg
 rar
 rpm (read)
 rzip
 snap
 sit
 sqsh
 tar
 xar
 xip
 xz
 z
 zip
 zoo
 zst

Limitations
Archive Manager does not give the advanced options to compress using different levels of compression via GUI (High, Normal, Low/Fast, etc). This can be set however using dconf-editor, or the old gconf-editor on GNOME 2.

See also
 Xarchiver
 Comparison of archive formats
 Comparison of file archivers

References

External links
 
 Manuals
 Source code

Archive managers that use GTK
File archivers
Free data compression software
Free software programmed in C
GNOME Applications
Software that uses Meson